Talisker is a settlement in Skye, Scotland

Talisker may also refer to:

 Talisker distillery, a whisky distillery near Talisker, in Carbost, Skye, Scotland.
 Talisker Conservation Park, Australia
 Talisker (band), by the Scottish percussionist Ken Hyder
 Talisker Corporation, the owner of Main Square in Toronto

See also
 Talisker Masters, the Australian Masters annual golf tournament